Gargi College is one of the top colleges affiliated to the University of Delhi. It was established in the year 1967 and offers education in Arts and Humanities, Commerce, Science and Education for women.
 Gargi College has been honoured with Star College Status by Department of Biotechnology, Government of India.

History
Gargi College was established in the year 1967.

Gargi College was named after an enlightened woman named Gargi Vachaknavi, figuring in the Brihadaranyaka Upanishada of the Vedic Age.

Gargi College, one of the two colleges in Delhi to have been awarded the college with a Potential for Excellence grant, by the University Grants Commission in the year 2004–2005. The college has nine departments namely Botany, Chemistry, Commerce, Elementary Education, Microbiology, Physics, Psychology, Zoology and the Women's Development Centre.

Campus 
It is one of the South Campus colleges of the University of Delhi.

Gargi possesses great infrastructural facilities. All the class rooms and laboratories are well-equipped. The whole campus is WiFi enabled and this facility is available to all students and staff members. An auditorium and seminar hall with a seating capacity of 750 and 150 respectively, exist.

 Auditorium: The auditorium can fit about 750 people including the main theatre and the mezzanine. It is also fully air conditioned and also has solar lighting installations.
 Bioinformatics Infrastructure Facility: One of the two Bioinformatics Infrastructure Facility in the University of Delhi is located at Gargi College and undergraduates from any Science discipline can access the facility as per faculty guidance.
 Bookstore: There is an on-campus bookstore that sells both curriculum books and stationery for the students. 
 Computer Laboratories: There are a total of 110 computers in the university across 3 computer labs.
 Food court: The canteen for the students is equipped with a varied menu and even has a water harvesting system. It is one of the most popular spots for students and is also equipped with a Nescafe Kiosk.
 Laboratories: The university boasts of well ventilated laboratories for Botany, Chemistry, Elementary Education, Microbiology, Physics, Psychology and Zoology.
 Medical Room: All students can avail medical facilities during college hours. In addition to this, regular health check-ups can are also conducted by well trained professionals.
 Open air theatre: An open air platform has been constructed for the students. It is often used for street play performances.
 Seminar Hall: The auditorium is accompanied by a seminar hall that can seat up to 125 people. It is used for several academic events on the university.
 Students’ Common Room
 Students' Union Room

Academics

Academic activities
The college arranges inter-disciplinary seminars at national level every year. Research is encouraged even at the undergraduate level. Summer workshops are conducted regularly for science students. Students regularly make presentations in departmental activities.

The result of the last two years University examinations records 99% pass and about 45-50% first divisions. On an average about 10 students obtain positions within the top 3 of the University of Delhi and about 35 within the top 5 of the South Campus.

Rankings
College ranked 16th among colleges in India by the National Institutional Ranking Framework during 2020..
Gargi has been ranked 9th among art colleges of India according to the India Today Survey, 2016. and 7th in the Department of Sciences.

Student life

Sports programmes
Gargi College owns a sports field where students train in various sports. Its students have been selected to represent DU in state and national tournaments in Judo, Basketball, Taekwondo, Volleyball and Tennis. In 2012, Gargi students emerged as chess champions of DU and the Judo team was runner up. In 2013, the college won gold medal in athletics and Judo and emerged second in tennis tournaments of DU and volleyball team also doing well.

Social outreach programmes and fests 
The NSS, NCC, Equal Opportunity Cell and Women's Development Centres of the college arrange events that sensitise Gargi's students to gender, economic and other issues. These create awareness about the social responsibility and provide the opportunity for rendering service to the society. The 2018 Fest - Reverie was noted to be one of the biggest in Delhi University. Artists including Aman Bathla (Painter), Candice Redding and Myris (DJ), Monali Thakur (Singer), Rahul Makin (RJ) and Faridkot (Band) were present at the event.

Notable alumni
 Alankrita Sahai -  Miss Diva Earth 2014
Huma Qureshi - Actress 
Sonal Chauhan - Femina Miss India Tourism 2005, Miss World Tourism 2005, model and Actress.
Urvashi Rautela- Miss Diva 2015 and Actress
Sanya Malhotra - Actress.

References

1967 establishments in Delhi
Educational institutions established in 1967
Delhi University
Universities and colleges in Delhi